The Prairie Athletic Conference (PAC) is the governing body for collegiate sports in Saskatchewan and it was founded in 1969. The PAC is currently represented by five schools, three in Saskatchewan, and two in Alberta, that compete in four sports.

The PAC was a member of the Canadian Collegiate Athletic Association until 1994.

Members
Current Members

Inactive Members

Former Members

Aldersgate College in Moose Jaw, Saskatchewan
Athol Murray College of Notre Dame Hounds in Wilcox, Saskatchewan
Ambrose University Lions in Calgary, Alberta
Assiniboine Community College Cougars in Brandon, Manitoba
Bethany College Eagles in Hepburn, Saskatchewan
Canadian Bible College Crusaders in Regina, Saskatchewan
Caronport High School Cougars in Caronport, Saskatchewan
Eston College in Eston, Saskatchewan
First Nations University of Canada Pumas in Regina, Saskatchewan
Luther College in Regina, Saskatchewan
Nipawin Bible College Royals in Nipawin, Saskatchewan
Regina Downtown Optimists in Regina, Saskatchewan
University of Regina Cougars in Regina, Saskatchewan (Junior Varsity)
University of Saskatchewan Huskies in Saskatoon, Saskatchewan (Junior Varsity)
SIAST Kelsey Amaruks in Saskatoon, Saskatchewan
SIAST Palliser Panthers/Beavers in Moose Jaw, Saskatchewan
SIAST Wascana Wildcats in Regina, Saskatchewan
SIAST Woodland Wild in Prince Albert, Saskatchewan
St. Thomas More College in Saskatoon, Saskatchewan

Sports
Current
Basketball
Futsal
Outdoor Soccer
Volleyball

Past
Badminton
Curling
Golf
Ice Hockey
Table Tennis

The men's basketball league held an all-star game in 2017 with all the best players from the PAC playing against Notre Dame Prep.

Provincial Champions

Men's Basketball 

Most Titles: Briercrest Clippers - 19
2021: Burman Bobcats (2) 
2020: Playoffs canceled due to the COVID-19 pandemic 
2019: Burman Bobcats (1)
2018: Saskatoon Amaruks (3)
2017: Saskatoon Amaruks (2)
2016: Prairie Pilots (2)
2015: Millar Edge (9)
2014: Kelsey Amaruks (1)
2013: Millar Edge (8)
2012: Bethany Eagles (3)
2011: Millar Edge (7)
2010: Millar Edge (6)
2009: Bethany Eagles (2)
2008: Millar Edge (5)
2007: Millar Edge (4)
2006: Millar Edge (3)
2005: Palliser Panthers (8)
2004: Bethany Eagles (1)
2003: Palliser Panthers (7)
2002: Palliser Panthers (6)
2001: CBC Crusaders (6)
2000: Palliser Panthers (5)
1999: CBC Crusaders (5)
1998: CBC Crusaders (4)
1997: Palliser Panthers (4)
1996: CBC Crusaders (3)
1995: Tier 1- Briercrest Clippers (19) Tier 2- Millar Edge (2)
1994: Tier 1- Prairie Pilots (1) Tier 2- Millar Edge (1)
1993: Briercrest Clippers (18)
1992: Briercrest Clippers (17)
1991: Briercrest Clippers (16)
1990: Briercrest Clippers (15)
1989: Briercrest Clippers (14)
1988: CBC Crusaders (2)
1987: STI Beavers (3)
1986: STI Beavers (2)
1985: CBC Crusaders (1)
1984: STI Beavers (1)
1983: Briercrest Clippers (13)
1982: Briercrest Clippers (12)
1981: Briercrest Clippers (11)
1980: Briercrest Clippers (10)
1979: Briercrest Clippers (9)
1978: Briercrest Clippers (8)
1977: Briercrest Clippers (7) (Won CCAA National Championship)
1976: Briercrest Clippers (6)
1975: Briercrest Clippers (5)
1974: Regina Cougars JV (1)
1973: Briercrest Clippers (4)
1972: Briercrest Clippers (3)
1971: Briercrest Clippers (2)
1970: Briercrest Clippers (1)

Women's Basketball 

Most Titles: Briercrest Clippers, Millar Edge, and Saskatoon Amaruks - 7
2021: Burman Bobcats (1) 
2020: Playoffs canceled due to the COVID-19 pandemic 
2019: Prairie Pilots (3)
2018: Prairie Pilots (2)
2017: Saskatoon Amaruks (7)
2016: Prairie Pilots (1)
2015: Millar Edge (7)
2014: Millar Edge (6)
2013: Millar Edge (5)
2012: Millar Edge (4)
2011: No season played
2010: Millar Edge (3)
2009: Millar Edge (2)
2008: Bethany Eagles (6)
2007: Bethany Eagles (5)
2006: Bethany Eagles (4)
2005: Palliser Panthers (5)
2004: Bethany Eagles (3)
2003: CBC Crusaders (6)
2002: Millar Edge (1)
2001: CBC Crusaders (5)
2000: Palliser Panthers (4)
1999: CBC Crusaders (4)
1998: Bethany Eagles (2)
1997: Palliser Panthers (3)
1996: Bethany Eagles (1)
1995: Tier 1- Briercrest Clippers (7) Tier 2- Palliser Panthers (2)
1994: Briercrest Clippers (6)
1993: Briercrest Clippers (5)
1992: Briercrest Clippers (4)
1991: Briercrest Clippers (3)
1990: Kelsey Amaruks (6)
1989: Briercrest Clippers (2)
1988: CBC Crusaders (3)
1987: Wascana Wildcats (5)
1986: Kelsey Amaruks (5)
1985: CBC Crusaders (2)
1984: Kelsey Amaruks (4)
1983: CBC Crusaders (1)
1982: Wascana Wildcats (4)
1981: Briercrest Clippers (1)
1980: Wascana Wildcats (3)
1979: Wascana Wildcats (2)
1978: Wascana Wildcats (1)
1977: Kelsey Amaruks (3)
1976: Kelsey Amaruks (2)
1975: Kelsey Amaruks (1)
1974: No season played
1973: STI Beavers (1)

Men's Volleyball 

Most Titles: Briercrest Clippers - 12
2022: Millar Edge (9) 
2021: No season played due to the COVID-19 pandemic
2020: No season played due to the COVID-19 pandemic
2019: Millar Edge (8)
2018: Briercrest Clippers JV (12)
2017: Millar Edge (7)
2016: Millar Edge (6)
2015: Prairie Pilots (1)
2014: Millar Edge (5)
2013: Great Plains SunDogs (3)
2012: Palliser Panthers (6)
2011: Great Plains SunDogs (2)
2010: Millar Edge (4)
2009: Great Plains SunDogs (1)
2008: Millar Edge (3)
2007: Kelsey Amaruks (11)
2006: Palliser Panthers (5)
2005: Millar Edge (2)
2004: Palliser Panthers (4)
2003: Bethany Eagles (7)
2002: Bethany Eagles (6)
2001: Kelsey Amaruks (10)
2000: Kelsey Amaruks (9)
1999: Bethany Eagles (5
1998: Bethany Eagles (4)
1997: Bethany Eagles (3)
1996: Bethany Eagles (2)
1995: Millar Edge (1)
1994: Bethany Eagles (1)
1993: Kelsey Amaruks (8)
1992: Briercrest Clippers (11)
1991: Briercrest Clippers (10)
1990: Briercrest Clippers (9)
1989: Briercrest Clippers (8)
1988: Kelsey Amaruks (7)
1987: Briercrest Clippers (7)
1986: Briercrest Clippers (6)
1985: Briercrest Clippers (5)
1984: Briercrest Clippers (4)
1983: Kelsey Amaruks (6)
1982: Kelsey Amaruks (5)
1981: Kelsey Amaruks (4) 
1980: Kelsey Amaruks (3)
1979: Kelsey Amaruks (2)
1978: STI Beavers (3)
1977: Briercrest Clippers (3)
1976: Briercrest Clippers (2)
1975: Kelsey Amaruks (1)
1974: Regina Cougars JV (3)
1973: Regina Cougars JV (2)
1972: Regina Cougars JV (1)
1971: STI Beavers (2)
1970: Briercrest Clippers (1)
1969: STI Beavers (1)

Women's Volleyball 

Most Titles: Saskatoon Amaruks - 24
2023: Millar Edge (2) 
2022: Millar Edge (1) 
2021: No season played due to the COVID-19 pandemic
2020: No season played due to the COVID-19 pandemic
2019: Great Plains SunDogs (2)
2018: Great Plains SunDogs (1)
2017: Briercrest Clippers JV (8)
2016: Saskatoon Amaruks (24)
2015: Saskatoon Amaruks (23)
2014: Saskatoon Amaruks (22)
2013: Kelsey Amaruks (21)
2012: Bethany Eagles (1)
2011: Palliser Panthers (7)
2010: Kelsey Amaruks (20)
2009: Kelsey Amaruks (19)
2008: Kelsey Amaruks (18)
2007: Kelsey Amaruks (17)
2006: Wascana Wildcats (3)
2005: Kelsey Amaruks (16)
2004: Wascana Wildcats (2)
2003: Kelsey Amaruks (15)
2002: Kelsey Amaruks (14)
2001: Palliser Panthers (6)
2000: Palliser Panthers (5)
1999: Kelsey Amaruks (13)
1998: Palliser Panthers (4)
1997: Palliser Panthers (3)
1996: Kelsey Amaruks (12)
1995: Kelsey Amaruks (11)
1994: Kelsey Amaruks (10)
1993: Kelsey Amaruks (9)
1992: Briercrest Clippers (7)
1991: Briercrest Clippers (6)
1990: Briercrest Clippers (5)
1989: Briercrest Clippers (4)
1988: Briercrest Clippers (3)
1987: Briercrest Clippers (2)
1986: STI Beavers (2)
1985: STI Beavers (1)
1984: Kelsey Amaruks (8)
1983: Kelsey Amaruks (7)
1982: Briercrest Clippers (1)
1981: Kelsey Amaruks (6)
1980: Kelsey Amaruks (5)
1979: Kelsey Amaruks (4)
1978: Kelsey Amaruks (3)
1977: Kelsey Amaruks (2)
1976: Wascana Wildcats (1)
1975: Kelsey Amaruks (1)
1974: Regina Cougars JV (3)
1973: Regina Cougars JV (2)
1972: Regina Cougars JV 1)

Men's Ice Hockey 

Most Titles: Kelsey Amaruks - 12
1990: Kelsey Amaruks (12)
1989: Palliser Beavers (6)
1988: Kelsey Amaruks (11)
1987: Kelsey Amaruks (10)
1986: STI Beavers (5)
1985: Kelsey Amaruks (9)
1984: Kelsey Amaruks (8)
1983: Kelsey Amaruks (7)
1982: STI Beavers (4)
1981: STI Beavers (3)
1980: Briercrest Clippers (2)
1979: STI Beavers (2)
1978: Kelsey Amaruks (6)
1977: Kelsey Amaruks (5)
1976: Kelsey Amaruks (4)
1975: Kelsey Amaruks (3)
1974: Kelsey Amaruks (2)
1973: Kelsey Amaruks (1)
1972: STI Beavers (1)
1971: Briercrest Clippers (1)
1970: CBC Crusaders (1)

Men's Indoor Soccer/Futsal 

Most Titles: Moose Jaw Panthers - 6
2023: Burman Bobcats (2) 
2022: Prairie Pilots (3) 
2021: No season played due to the COVID-19 pandemic
2020: No season played due to the COVID-19 pandemic
2019: Burman Bobcats (1)
2018: Saskatoon Amaruks (1)
2017: Moose Jaw Panthers (6)
2016: Prairie Pilots (2)
2015: Prairie Pilots (1)
2014: Bethany Eagles (4)
2013: Bethany Eagles (3)
2012: Bethany Eagles (2)
2011: Nipawin Royals (1)
2010: Briercrest Clippers (1)
2009: Millar Edge (1)
2008: Bethany Eagles (1)
2007: Palliser Panthers (5)
2006: Palliser Panthers (4)
2005: Palliser Panthers (3)
2004: Palliser Panthers (2)
2003: CBC Crusaders (3)
2002: Palliser Panthers (1)
2001: CBC Crusaders (2)
2000: CBC Crusaders (1)

Women's Indoor Soccer/Futsal 

Most Titles: Millar Edge - 8
2023: Burman Bobcats (3) 
2022: Burman Bobcats (2) 
2021: No season played due to the COVID-19 pandemic
2020: No season played due to the COVID-19 pandemic
2019: Burman Bobcats (1)
2018: Saskatoon Amaruks (1)
2017: Millar Edge (8)
2016: Millar Edge (7)
2015: Millar Edge (6)
2014: Bethany Eagles (4)
2013: Prairie Pilots (1)
2012: Millar Edge (5)
2011: Bethany Eagles (3)
2010: Millar Edge (4)
2009: Millar Edge (3)
2008: Bethany Eagles (2)
2007: Millar Edge (2)
2006: Briercrest Clippers (3)
2005: Briercrest Clippers (2)
2004: Palliser Panthers (2)
2003: Millar Edge (1)
2002: Bethany Eagles (1)
2001: Palliser Panthers (1)
2000: Briercrest Clippers (1)

Men's Outdoor Soccer 

Most Titles: Millar Edge - 8
2020: No season played due to the COVID-19 pandemic
2019: Millar Edge (8)
2018: Briercrest Clippers (4)
2017: Briercrest Clippers (3)
2016: Millar Edge (7)
2015: Prairie Pilots (1)
2014: Millar Edge (6)
2013: Bethany Eagles (4)
2012: Bethany Eagles (3)
2011: Championship cancelled
2010: Nipawin Royals (1)
2009: Briercrest Clippers (2)
2008: Millar Edge (5)
2007: Millar Edge (4)
2006: Briercrest Clippers (1)
2005: Millar Edge (3)
2004: Bethany Eagles (2)
2003: Bethany Eagles (1)
2002: Millar Edge (2)
2001: Millar Edge (1)

Women's Outdoor Soccer 

Most Titles: Millar Edge - 8
2020: No season played due to the COVID-19 pandemic
2019: Briercrest Clippers (5)
2018: Briercrest Clippers (4)
2017: Briercrest Clippers (3)
2016: Millar Edge (8)
2015: Millar Edge (7)
2014: Millar Edge (6)
2013: Millar Edge (5)
2012: Millar Edge (4)
2011: Championship cancelled
2010: Millar Edge (3)
2009: Briercrest Clippers (2)
2008: Millar Edge (2)
2007: Millar Edge (1)
2006: Briercrest Clippers (1)
2005: Bethany Eagles (3)
2004: Bethany Eagles (2)
2003: Bethany Eagles (1)

Badminton

2016: Millar Edge
2015: Millar Edge
PAC medal results at CCAA Badminton Championships
1982: Silver - Women's Doubles - Carol Slater/Cathy Reed - Kelsey Amaruks
1982: Silver - Women's Singles - Peggy Heduc - Wascana Wildcats

Curling

2015: Millar Edge
PAC Medal Results at CCAA Curling National Championships
1990: Kelsey Amaruks - Women (Bronze)
1989: Palliser Beavers - Mixed (Silver)
1988: Palliser Beavers - Mixed (Bronze)
1988: Palliser Beavers - Men (Bronze)
1988: Palliser Beavers - Women (Silver)
1987: STI Beavers - Women (Gold)
1986: Kelsey Amaruks - Mixed (Silver)
1986: STI Beavers - Men (Bronze)
1985: Kelsey Amaruks - Mixed (Bronze)
1985: STI Beavers - Mixed (Silver)
1985: STI Beavers - Men (Silver)
1985: Kelsey Amaruks - Women (Silver)
1984: STI Beavers - Women (Gold)
1984: STI Beavers - Mixed (Silver)

Table Tennis

2017: Millar Edge (2)
2016: Millar Edge (1)

References

External links
 https://www.pacsport.ca/

Sports leagues in Saskatchewan
Sports governing bodies in Saskatchewan
Sports governing bodies in Canada
College athletics conferences in Canada